Sorin Cristian Bustea (born 22 December 1994) is a Romanian professional footballer who plays as a midfielder for CSA Steaua București. In his career, Bustea also played for Daco-Getica București and Sportul Snagov.

Honours
Daco-Getica București
Liga II: 2016–17

UTA Arad
Liga II: 2019–20

References

External links

 
 

1994 births
Living people
Footballers from Bucharest
Romanian footballers
Association football midfielders
Liga I players
Liga II players
FC UTA Arad players
ASC Daco-Getica București players
CS Sportul Snagov players
CSA Steaua București footballers